Highway 111 is a  controlled-access highway in Halifax Regional Municipality, Nova Scotia, Canada.

Highway 111 varies in width from 4-12 lanes and is known colloquially as the Circumferential Highway, or, more recently, "the Circ", because it forms a partial orbital road around Dartmouth.  The highway runs from Pleasant Street in the neighbourhood of Woodside in the south to the A. Murray MacKay Bridge in the north.

It serves as a key transportation link for Dartmouth and Halifax. The section from Highway 118 (Woodland Avenue) to the MacKay Bridge was constructed at the same time as the bridge, opening in 1970. The portion from Pleasant Street to Woodland Avenue was built in 1960 and was twinned in 1977.

Micmac Rotary
The Micmac (or Mic Mac) Rotary was a traffic circle located at the intersection of Hwy 111 with Route 318 (Braemar Drive) and Trunk 7 (Main Street/Prince Albert Road/Grahams Grove).  It was named after nearby Lake Micmac, which was partially in-filled to accommodate it. The Micmac Rotary was notorious for rush hour congestion, even resulting in the recording of a song entitled "Mic Mac Rotary Blues".

The rotary was removed during a redesign of the intersection in the late 1980s which saw it replaced by the "Micmac Parclo", which consists of a series of overpasses and controlled access lanes.  The resulting roadway through the Parclo and across Lake Micmac to the interchange with Highway 118 is the widest in Atlantic Canada at 10-12 lanes.

Highway of Heroes
On May 22, 2013 Highway 111 was officially named "Highway of Heroes" by Premier Darrell Dexter.

Exit list

See also 
List of highways named Circumferential Highway
List of highways named Highway of Heroes

References

External links

Google Maps Satellite view of Highway 111

111
Limited-access roads in Canada
111
Ring roads in Canada